Spike (Hebrew: ספייק) is an Israeli fire-and-forget anti-tank guided missile and anti-personnel missile with a tandem-charge high-explosive anti-tank (HEAT) warhead. , it is in its fourth generation. It was developed and designed by the Israeli company Rafael Advanced Defense Systems. It is available in man-portable, vehicle-launched, and helicopter-launched variants.

The missile can engage and destroy targets within the line-of-sight of the launcher ("fire-and-forget"), and some variants can make a top attack through a "fire, observe and update" method (essentially lock-on after launch); the operator tracking the target, or switching to another target, optically through the trailing fiber-optic wire (or RF link in the case of the vehicle-mounted, long-range NLOS variant) while the missile is climbing to altitude after launch. This is similar to the lofted trajectory flight profile of the US FGM-148 Javelin.

Design

Spike is a fire-and-forget missile with lock-on before launch and automatic self-guidance. The missile is equipped with an imaging infrared seeker.

The long and extended range versions of the Spike also have the capability of "Fire, Observe and Update" operating mode (also known as Lock-on after launch (LOAL)). The missile is connected by a fiber-optical wire that is spooled out between the launch position and the missile. With this, the operator can obtain a target if it is not in the line of sight of the operator at launch, switch targets in flight, or compensate for the movement of the target if the missile is not tracking the target for some reason. Hence, the missile can be fired speculatively for a target of opportunity, or to provide observation on the other side of an obstacle. The missile has a soft launch capability – the motor firing after the missile has left the launcher – that allows the missile to be fired from confined spaces, which is a necessity in urban warfare.

The missile uses a tandem warhead consisting of two shaped charges: a precursor warhead to detonate any explosive reactive armor, and a primary warhead to penetrate the underlying armor. Currently, it is replacing aging semi-automatic command to line of sight second generation anti-tank missiles like the MILAN and M47 Dragon in the armies of the user nations. Spike missile is also equipped with heat chasing technology.

The Spike system is made up of the launching tripod with its fire control unit and the missile. There is no dedicated thermal sight on the launcher: the missile's imaging seeker is used.

Spike can be operated from the launcher by infantry, or from mounts that can be fitted to vehicles such as fast attack vehicles, armoured personnel carriers or utility vehicles. Vehicles that are not normally fitted with anti-tank weapons can therefore be given anti-tank capability.

Spike has been tested as a weapon system for the SAGEM Sperwer unmanned aerial vehicle. The Spanish Army has fitted the Spike-ER to its Eurocopter Tiger attack helicopters. Both Israel and the United States have experimented with arming Sikorsky UH-60 Black Hawk helicopters with the Spike missile; the US variant is used in UH-60M Battlehawk helicopters.

Marketing
In order to facilitate the selling of the weapon system in Europe, the company EuroSpike GmbH was formed in Germany. Its shareholders are Diehl Defence (40%), Rheinmetall Defence Electronics (40%) and Rafael via ERCAS B.V (20%). ERCAS B.V. is a Dutch holding company owned 100% by Rafael. 

EuroSpike GmbH is located in Röthenbach, Germany. The European variant of the Spike weapon system differs a little from the Israeli version and is marketed under the name EuroSpike.

The missiles were also marketed and produced under license in Singapore by ST Engineering.

For other areas of the world, Rafael Advanced Defense Systems Ltd. is solely responsible.

Variants

Spike-SR
The short range version of the weapon was unveiled in 2012 to give infantrymen a guided missile between the larger Spike-MR and unguided rockets. It is equipped with a stiff-necked uncooled electro-optical infrared seeker and advanced tracker, as opposed to the gimballed seeker in the Spike MR/LR/ER versions. The Spike-SR does not require a separate sight, instead utilizing the low-cost thermal camera and guidance electronics strapped to the missile's nose to provide this function through a display integrated into the launcher, showing the target until launch. The warhead can either be a multi-purpose tandem shaped-charge warhead with blast-fragmentation effect or a new Penetration-Blast-Fragmentation (PBF) variant leveraged from the MATADOR's anti-structure warhead to equip maneuvering forces in urban environments to breach enemy cover and structures with a lethal blast effect. In May 2016 Rafael concluded deliveries of Spike-SR to its first export customer, later revealed to be the Singapore Armed Forces to replace the Carl Gustaf M2.

Spike-MR
The medium range version (Israeli designation: NT-Gil). It is used by infantry and special forces.

Spike-LR
Long range version (Israeli designation: NT-Spike). It adds fiber-optic communication to and from the operator during flight. It is also deployed in Sentry Tech remotely controlled weapons stations along the Gaza border.

Spike-LR II

A new generation of the original Spike-LR is in full-scale development and scheduled to be operational by the end of 2018. The missile is designed with a counter-active protection system (CAPS) capability, being able to hit targets at higher impact angles of up to 70 degrees. First ordered by the Israel Defense Forces (IDF) in October 2017.

Spike-ER
Extended range or extra-long range version of the weapon (Israeli designation: NT-Dandy or NT-D). It has a larger diameter and is heavier than the other systems, and is usually vehicle mounted. It is used by infantry, Light Combat Vehicle (LCVs), and helicopters. The Finnish Navy's Coastal Jaegers and Philippine Navy's Multi-purpose Attack Craft Mk.III also operate this version in the anti-ship role.

Spike-ER II
In August 2018, Rafael disclosed the development of an enhancement of the missile called the Spike-ER II.

Spike NLOS
It can be launched from the ground or from helicopters. It was developed following lessons learned in the Yom Kippur War, which showed a need for a high-precision guided tactical ground-to-ground battlefield missile. The first variants entered service with the Israel Defense Forces (IDF) in tandem with the Pereh missile carrier in 1981, though the existence of both was not revealed to the public until 2011. The Spike NLOS uses a fiber optic link similar to other Spike versions, but only out to 8 km, after which it employs a radio data link for command guidance.

In 2011 it also became known that in a highly unusual move, the British Army was hastily equipped with the missile for counter-mortar fire, drawn directly from IDF inventory after being exposed to increasing insurgent attacks in Iraq, beginning in 2007 three variants of the NLOS were procured. A total of 600 missiles were acquired, the breakdown being 200 optical camera equipped NLOS MK.2 in 2007, 200 thermal imaging equipped NLOS MK.4 in 2008 for night operations (together with the MK.2 these were known as EXACTOR-1), 200 dual camera equipped NLOS MK.5 (EXACTOR-2) followed in 2009 which featured wings for slower but better maneuvering flight and a multi-purpose warhead replacing the anti-armor warhead of previous versions. For operational security, the codename of 'EXACTOR missile' was assigned in British service and it was initially mounted on launchers atop leased M113 APCs. The MK.2 performed badly being too fast and difficult to control, the M113 overheated in the desert and had a poor resolution camera display that compared unfavorably with its contemporaries. So Britain financed the development of the Mk. 5 known in British service as the EXACTOR 2 which replaced the M113 APC with a towed trailer known as SPARC holding four missiles in a 360-degree rotating turret that could be remotely controlled up to 500m away ditching the non-standard M113 APCs altogether when in 2010 the batteries were transferred from Iraq to Afghanistan.

In a deal concluded on 6 September 2011, the South Korean government had agreed to purchase an unknown number of Mk. 5 Spike NLOS missiles.

Rafael is working on expanding the missile's versatility by enhancing the existing EO-IR/CCD seeker with semi-active laser (SAL) capability and different anti-armor, blast-penetration, and high-explosive fragmentation warheads to meet specific applications.

In 2020 the US Army announced its intention to procure Spike NLOS missiles to be mounted on Apache helicopters.

It also has a Target Image Acquisition capability that can prioritize important targets for strike, and can be carried by strategic UAVs in the Heron-TP-class.

Mini-Spike
On 2 September 2009, at an IDF exhibition held at the third Latrun annual land warfare conference, the Israeli Defense Force unveiled a new member of the Spike family of missiles – the Mini Spike Anti-personnel guided weapon (APGW). It was to introduce new flight modes to enable precision strikes in urban areas, such as flying through windows or attacking an enemy hidden behind defilade or obstacles using non-line-of-sight engagement. Mini Spike would use the same launcher and sight system of the Spike-LR, loading the missile on a special adaptor. By 2016, Mini-Spike development had been discontinued.

Almas
Iran received Israeli Spike-MRs captured during the 2006 Lebanon War by Hezbollah fighters. An unlicensed variant that goes by the name of Almas.
The ATGM was unveiled in public on July 7, 2021.

Aerospike
In May 2022, Rafael unveiled the Aerospike, a version of the Spike-LR II designed to be launched from fixed-wing aircraft. The munition does not require GPS to navigate, incorporating scene-matching technology and detection and tracking capabilities. A real-time RF data-link allows for man-in-the-loop operation enabling mid-flight target handover, re-targeting and abort options while also controlling approach angle, azimuth and flight trajectory, achieving accuracy within 3 meters of the target with a HEAT or blast fragmentation warhead. By the time of public announcement, the Aerospike was already in service with unnamed users.

Operators

 Ordered unknown number of Spike-LR II missiles in 2018, for use on Boxer IFV.

 Total 350 Spike-LR and 250 Spike-NLOS missiles, some of which are mounted on the Plasan Sand Cat, and Mil Mi-17.

 240 Spike-MR/LR missiles ordered in 2013, delivery completed in 2015.

 100 Spike-LR missiles ordered in November 2021.

 Spike-LR missiles since 2016.

 Total 2,200 Spike-MR/LR/ER missiles, for use on modernised Marder IFVs.

 Total 85 Spike-LR/ER and 110 Spike-NLOS missiles. The Colombian Air Force's fleet of Sikorsky AH-60L Arpía IV-series helicopters are armed with three variants of the Spike: the ER, LR and NLOS.

 Croatia has ordered 20 Spike LRII launchers for its Patria AMV armored vehicles. However this is initial order, talks of 80 to 100 additional launchers for 31 brand new Patria IFVs that are on order and to join Croatian Army from 2023 to 2026. There is no indication if Croatia will purchase Spike MR or SR for its infantry formations. Croatia ordered 200 Spike LR2 missiles initially for $1.25 million.

 Total 500 Spike-LR missiles, for use on KBVP IFVs.

 Spike-LR II To be integrated in the Royal Danish Army from 2021 to 2025. Will be used by infantry and from Protector Remote Weapon Station.

 Total 244 missiles, delivered October 2009.

 18 Spike-LR II launchers bought from EuroSpike GmbH. More than 500 Spike-SR systems purchased in 2022.

 Total 900 missiles, breakdown being 300 Spike-MR, 200 Spike-LR with the remaining 400 being Spike-ER. 100 MR (Panssarintorjuntaohjusjärjestelmä 2000) launchers plus an option for 70 more, and 18 ER (Rannikko-ohjus 2006) launchers for coastal anti-ship use. Also Spike-LR missiles as a newer purchase. In December 2022 Finland ordered additional Spike SR, LR2 and ER2 missiles for 223.6 MEUR.

 Total 6,000 Spike-LR missiles, 311 LR launchers on Puma IFVs., over 214 launchers for the infantry, also planned to be used on Wiesel AWCs

 27 Spike-NLOS systems on 4x4 vehicles, Plasan SandCat or JLTV, 28 AH-64 Apache helicopters and 4 Machitis-class gunboats.

 Spike-LR II for Lynx armoured fighting vehicles.

 Defense News reported that the Indian Army wanted to order Spike missiles and peripheral equipment in a $1 billion deal. Indian Ministry of Defence officials told the magazine that the order is for 321 launchers, 8,356 missiles, 15 training simulators, and peripheral equipment. In October 2014, India chose to buy the Spike over the U.S. Javelin. India's state-owned Bharat Dynamics Limited will be the systems integrator for the missiles with major work share for manufacture to be handled by Bharat Dynamics and Kalyani Group. On 20 November 2017, it was announced that the deal was cancelled due to lack of transfer of technology. The DRDO has been instructed to produce an indigenous missile. However, Indian media sources have reported that the contract will proceed as part of a restructured government to government agreement. In April 2019, following the 2019 border skirmishes with Pakistan, the Indian Army approved an emergency purchase of 240 Spike MR missiles and 12 launchers to meet immediate requirements, which were inducted into service in early October 2019.

 Unlicensed clone as Almas. Reverse engineered Spike-MR with modifications. Originally captured by Hezbollah during the 2006 Lebanon War and given to Iran. 

 The Spike NLOS (Tammuz) was introduced into service in the early 1980s.
In 1997, the Spike MR (Gil), LR (Gomed), ER (Perakh Bar) with associated launchers entered service.

 Total 1,490 Spike-LR and 750 Spike-ER missiles (with associated launchers and training systems), Spike-LR are for use on Dardo IFV, Freccia IFV and VTLM Lince while Spike-ER are for use by AH-129 Mangusta attack helicopters.

 Total 12 Spike-LR. Additional order in February 2018.

 Total 1,000 Spike-LR missiles delivered, for use on Boxer armored vehicles.
 

Morocco has ordered unknown quantities of the Spike LR2 and the Spike NLOS from Israel in 2021 
 Total 2,400+ Spike-MR missiles (including 297 launchers and associated training systems) ordered in 2001, deliveries began in 2006 and was completed by 2011. A total of 237 launchers and 1,974 missiles was assigned to the Royal Netherlands Army, while the remaining 60 launchers and 459 missiles was assigned to the Royal Netherlands Marine Corps. The first weapon was actually issued in 2004 to the Regiment van Heutsz.

 Total 516 Spike-LR and 175 Spike-ER missiles (including 48 launchers).

 The Philippine Navy operates the missiles. Spike-ER variant for the missile-capable versions of its Multipurpose Assault Crafts. Spike-NLOS are for the Navy's AW159 Wildcat helicopters and upcoming Acero-class fast attack interdiction crafts.

 Total 2,675 Spike-LR missiles (with 263 launchers and training systems) ordered in 2003 with deliveries completed by 2013, for use on Rosomak IFVs. A follow-up order of 1,000 Spike-LR missiles was placed in 2015 with deliveries beginning in 2017 to be completed by 2020.

 Total 3,000 missiles, breakdown being 2,000 Spike-LR (for use on MLI-84M IFVs) with the remaining 1,000 being Spike-ER (for use on IAR 330 SOCAT attack helicopters).

 In 1999, Singapore became the second country to acquire the Spike ATGM. Total 1,500 Spike-LR missiles (with associated launchers and training systems) received between 2001 and 2006. Between 2017 and 2018, another 500 Spike-SR was received as the new generation anti-tank guided missile for its infantry battalions. The Hunter AFV of the Singapore Army is equipped with a twin tube pop-up launcher. There has been further orders for the Spike-LR II for use on the Hunter AFV and infantry units.

 Spike-LR II (100 missiles, 10 launchers).

 Spike-MR/LR has been in operational use in the Slovenian Armed Forces since 2009. Total 75 missiles. Some will be on Patria AMVs. In September 2022, EuroSpike was awarded a $6.6 million contract to supply 50 Spike LR2s.

 Under a deal reached in 2020, the Royal Thai Army took delivery of the Spike-MR missiles and launchers. Spike-MR was a contender along with Javelin.

 A South Korean government deal concluded on 6 September 2011 confirmed the procurement of unspecified numbers of Spike NLOS, of which about 50 missiles will be forward deployed to the South Korean islands of Baengnyeongdo and Yeonpyeongdo, close to the Northern Limit Line with North Korea. On 19 May 2013 the South Korean military confirmed that "dozens" of Spike missiles had been deployed on the islands. The Republic of Korea Navy will also deploy the Spike NLOS on AgustaWestland AW159 Wildcat helicopters, and the Republic of Korea Marine Corps has the Spike NLOS mounted on Plasan Sand Cat light vehicle.

 Total 2,630 Spike-LR (including 260 launchers and associated training systems) and 200 Spike-ER missiles (for use by Eurocopter Tiger attack helicopters). A total of 236 launchers and 2,360 Spike-LR missiles was assigned to the Spanish Army, while the remaining 24 launchers and 240 missiles was assigned to the Spanish Marines.

 600 Spike-NLOS missiles were procured by the British Army, the exact breakdown being 200 NLOS MK.2, 200 NLOS MK.4 and 200 NLOS MK.5 ordered in the years 2007, 2008 and 2009, respectively. In British service it has the name 'Exactor'.

 The Spike was offered by Rafael Advanced Defense Systems as a possible contender in the US Army JAWS missile program in 1996. In January 2020, the Army revealed it would field the Spike NLOS on AH-64 Apache helicopters as an interim solution to acquire a longer range stand-off weapon.

Evaluations

 In January 1998, a partnership arrangement was announced between Israel Aerospace Industries and Kamov to market the Kamov Ka-50-2 attack helicopter in Turkish competition. One of the optional armaments being offered for the Ka-50-2 was the Spike-ER missile. Eventually, Ka-50-2 lost to TAI/AgustaWestland T129 ATAK. Turkey has also examined the use of Rafael Overhead Weapon Station with Spike for its Otokar Cobra light armored vehicles.

 In February 2001, the British MoD awarded two contracts valued at $8.8 million for a year-long assessment of the Javelin and Spike-MR. The Spike was being offered by Rafael Advanced Defense Systems teamed with Matra BAe Dynamics, while the Javelin was being offered by a team of Lockheed Martin and Raytheon. The UK would like to field a lightweight antitank missile system for its Joint Rapid Reaction Force by 2005. In February 2003, the British MoD selected the Javelin.

Failed bids 

 A total of 20 Spike-MR/LR launchers would be fitted on Portuguese Marine Corps Pandur II APC's, but the program was cancelled due to problems between the Portuguese government, Steyr-Daimler-Puch and Fabrequipa (local Pandur II manufacturer).

See also
 ALAS (missile)
 HJ-12
 Missile Moyenne Portée
 MPATGM
 OMTAS
 Raybolt
 Sadid-1
 Stugna-P
 Type 01 LMAT

References

External links

 Official website – Rafael Advanced Defence System, for worldwide marketing
 Official website – EuroSpike GmbH, for marketing in Europe
 Singapore Army's facsheet on Spike ATGM
 Defense-Update.Com's webpage on Spike
 Spike anti-tank anti-armour guided missile on armyrecognition.com
 Rafael Spike Missile

Video links
 
 
 
 
  by Finnish Coastal Jäger troops of the Finnish Navy
 
 

Anti-tank guided missiles of Israel
Rafael Advanced Defense Systems
Television guided weapons
Military equipment introduced in the 1980s
Fire-and-forget weapons